T. sanctus may refer to:
 Todiramphus sanctus, the sacred kingfisher
 Tarachodes sanctus, a species of praying mantis